Richard Sweetman (born 28 July 1990 in Maitland, New South Wales) is an Australian speedway rider who rode for several British teams.

Born in Maitland, the birthplace of motorcycle speedway (1926), Sweetman won the New South Wales Under-21 individual championship in 2007. He has previously ridden for the Swindon Robins, Isle of Wight Islanders, Birmingham Brummies, Belle Vue Aces, and Coventry Bees.

He signed for Leicester Lions for the 2011 season, but was allowed to leave Leicester in June, stating that he wanted to take a break from the sport, only to sign for Glasgow Tigers a few days later.

References

1990 births
Living people
Australian speedway riders
Leicester Lions riders
People from Maitland, New South Wales
Sportsmen from New South Wales